Farlanders may refer to 

 The Farlanders, a working title of the 2009 film, Away We Go
 The Farlanders, a musical act.

It may also refer to:

 Farlander, a book written by Col Buchanan.